The Kalamazoo Transportation Center is an intermodal complex in downtown Kalamazoo, Michigan. Amtrak and Greyhound provide regular service there. The center is also the major downtown transfer hub for Kalamazoo's Metro Transit bus system.

Amtrak does not allow passengers to check luggage at Kalamazoo, but does permit carry-on of up to two suitcases plus "personal items" such as briefcases, purses, laptop bags, and infant gear.

Development 

The original depot was built in 1887 by the Michigan Central Railroad, to a design by architect Cyrus L. W. Eidlitz, replacing an earlier structure. In the main part of its history in the latter 19th century and early 20th century, it hosted trains for the Michigan Central and the New York Central. Major NYC named trains passing through the station included the Canadian (east to Detroit and Toronto), the Chicago Mercury (east to Detroit) and the Wolverine (NYC train) (east to New York via Detroit and southwestern Canada, in contrast to the modern train).

It was added to the National Register of Historic Places on July 11, 1975.

The station was rebuilt as a multi-modal facility in the early 21st century. The project was a collaboration between local, state, and federal authorities, with the Department of Transportation awarding a $3.8 million grant.

Description
The original Kalamazoo depot is a single-story Romanesque structure with a high hip-roofed central mass, and  smaller hip-roofed sections on each end. A gable-roofed porch with a Syrian arch protrudes on one side of the central mass. The main structure has strong horizontal lines, counterbalanced by brick chimneys and an octagonal cupola that extend vertically from the roof. A conical turret and rock-faced masonry arches in the facade provide the Romanesque feel.

References

Further reading

External links

Kalamazoo Amtrak Station (USA Rail Guide -- Train Web)
Kalamazoo County Listings on the National Register of Historic Places
Kalamazoo Transportation Center (Michigan Passenger Stations)
Kalamazoo Station (Ron's Amtrak Photos)

Amtrak stations in Michigan
Bus stations in Michigan
Michigan Line
Railway stations in the United States opened in 1887
Railway stations on the National Register of Historic Places in Michigan
Transit centers in the United States
Buildings and structures in Kalamazoo, Michigan
Transportation in Kalamazoo County, Michigan
National Register of Historic Places in Kalamazoo County, Michigan
Former Michigan Central Railroad stations